Operation Lion Pounce was a series of operations conducted by the Multi-national force in and around Diwaniyah (Iraq) to disrupt, isolate and neutralize militants, insurgents and criminal organizations.

References 
 Operation Lion Pounce Returns Diwaniyah to its People, 10 December 2007, Operation Iraqi Freedom

Military operations of the Iraq War in 2007